Secchi may refer to:

People with the surname
 Angelo Secchi, Italian astronomer
 Giuseppe Secchi (1931–2018), Italian footballer
 Luciano Secchi (born 1939), Italian comic book writer and publisher
 Luigi Secchi (1853-1921), Italian sculptor
 Marco Secchi, Italian photographer
 Serafino Secchi (died 1628), Italian clergyman

Other uses
 Secchi (lunar crater)
 Secchi (Martian crater)
 Secchi depth, a measure of turbidity
 Secchi disk, an instrument used to measure turbidity
 SECCHI (Sun Earth Connection Coronal and Heliospheric Investigation), an instrument package on each of the STEREO spacecraft

Italian-language surnames